The Prosecutor v. Galić was a case before the International Criminal Tribunal for the former Yugoslavia in The Hague, Netherlands, concerning about crimes against humanity committed during the Siege of Sarajevo by Stanislav Galić during the Bosnian War. In 2003, Stanislav Galić was found guilty of 5 of 7 counts of crime including crimes against humanity, and was sentenced to 20 years of imprisonment. He was also found guilty of acts of violence, the primary purpose of which was to spread terror among the civilian population. However, due to an appeal by the prosecution and Galić, his sentence was increased from 20 years to life imprisonment. He was the first person to receive such a severe sentence at that tribunal. He was taken to Germany to serve his sentence.

Arrest 
In 1998, the International Criminal Tribunal for the former Yugoslavia (ICTY) indicted him. SFOR arrested him on 20 December, 1999 and transferred him to The Hague on 21 December, 1999.

Trial 
His trial began on 3 December 2001 and ended on 9 May 2003 when he was found guilty of 5 of the 7 counts of crimes against humanity and sentenced to a single sentence of 20 years.

Appeal 
On 30 November 2006, the prosecution and Galić appealed to the 20-year-long sentence. The Appeals Chamber rendered its judgement on 30 November 2006, sentencing Galić to life imprisonment. However, The Appeals Chamber dismissed all 19 grounds of appeals by Galić, including those which claimed that the Trial Chamber wrongly convicted him of the “acts or threats of violence the primary purpose of which was to spread terror among the civilian population” of Sarajevo.

On 15 January 2009, Galić was transferred to Germany to serve his sentence.

References 



Trials by the International Criminal Tribunal for the former Yugoslavia